Enrica Cipolloni (born 19 October 1990) is an Italian heptathlete, who won two national championships at individual senior level from 2014 to 2018.

Achievements

National titles
Italian Athletics Indoor Championships
Pentathlon: 2014, 2018

References

External links
 
 
 Enrica Cipolloni at FIDAL 

1990 births
Living people
Italian female high jumpers
Italian female long jumpers
Italian heptathletes
Athletics competitors of Fiamme Oro